The Anti-Communist Foreign Legion of the Caribbean (LAC) was an anti-Castroist right-wing paramilitary group based in the Dominican Republic funded by the dictators Rafael Trujillo of the Dominican Republic, Anastasio Somoza of Nicaragua and former Cuban Secret Police Chief Orlando Piedra.  The purpose of the group was to overthrow the government of Fidel Castro in Cuba. It was dissolved in August 1961 following Trujillo's death.

The group was made up of Spaniards, Cubans, Croatians, Germans, Greeks and right-wing mercenaries trained in the Dominican Republic. The group staged a failed attempt to overthrow Castro in 1959.

A different organisation called the Anti-Communist League later had its headquarters at Guy Banister's New Orleans office. The same location appeared on Fair Play for Cuba Committee leaflets distributed by Lee Harvey Oswald and such references to the league are often made in texts concerning conspiracy theories relating to Kennedy assassination. However the Legion and League were separate organisations with no apparent connection except in their opposition to Castro's Cuba.

References

Anti-communist organizations
John F. Kennedy assassination conspiracy theories